Michael Perrier (born 1 March 1989) is a Swiss footballer.

Perrier made his top division debut during 2013–14 Swiss Super League.

Biography
Son of former Sion player Bernard Perrier, Perrier started his career at Lugano, from Italian speaking canton of Ticino. Perrier was signed by the sister club, Italian Serie A side Genoa on 18 May 2009 for €650,000. Perrier signed a 3-year contract but spent whole of the contract in temporary deals in Lugano (2009–10) and Chiasso (2010–12). On 1 July 2012 he became a free agent. He was signed by fellow Swiss second division club Bellinzona, which also from Ticino on 13 June 2012 in 1-year contract.

On 31 August 2013 he was signed by Sion of Swiss Super League. His contract was soon extended.

Michael Perrier signed with Stade Lausanne Ouchy in 2019.

International career
Perrier had capped 5 times for Switzerland U-20 team, all in the Four Nations.

Honours 
Sion
Swiss Cup: 2014–15

References

External links
Profile at Swiss Football League 

1989 births
Living people
People from Sion, Switzerland
Swiss men's footballers
FC Lugano players
Genoa C.F.C. players
FC Chiasso players
AC Bellinzona players
FC Stade Lausanne Ouchy players
Swiss Super League players
Swiss Challenge League players
Association football midfielders
Sportspeople from Valais